Krościenko nad Dunajcem  is a village in southern Poland situated in the Nowy Targ County in Lesser Poland Voivodeship since 1999 (previously in Nowy Sącz Voivodeship, from 1975 to 1998). Town rights were given to Krościenko by Kazimierz Wielki in 1348.

History
Krościenko is one of the oldest settlements in Polish part of the Pieniny Mountains. Its history dates back to the late 12th century, when it was a village serving the now non-existing Pieniny Castle (see also Dunajec river castles). In 1348, Kazimierz Wielki granted Magdeburg rights to Krościenko, and shaped the village into a medieval town, with a market square and street grid. Royal decree, giving the charter to Krościenko does not exist, as it was burned in a Hussite raid in 1433. At that time the town was named Crosna in documents.

Due to convenient location along a merchant route to Hungary, Krościenko prospered. In 1350, a Roman Catholic parish was established here, and in 1565, a parish school was opened. The period known as Polish Golden Age ended in the 17th century, when Krościenko was affected by several wars (see Swedish invasion of Poland, Great Northern War) and rebellions (see Kostka-Napierski Uprising). As a result, by mid-18th century Krościenko was almost deserted.

In 1770, Krościenko was occupied by the Habsburg Empire. The town became property of Austrian treasury, which in 1822 sold it to the Gross family. New owners noticed local mineral waters, and decided to turn Krościenko into a spa, with guest houses and baths. In 1934, Krościenko was officially recognized as a spa. In the Second Polish Republic, it became a very popular tourist resort, located in close proximity to Pieniny National Park. Nevertheless, the number of permanent residents was so low that in 1932 Krościenko lost its town charter.

In 1973, Krościenko was joined with nearby Szczawnica, and the town of Szczawnica–Krościenko was created. In 1982, this idea was abandoned, due to protests of residents.

Tourism
Numerous tourist attractions include Pieniny National Park Museum, the 14th-century church rebuilt in Baroque style in 1589, and in summer, walk trails in the Pieniny mountains. There are holiday cottages and paths for mountain biking both advanced and easy. In winter, ski lift at Szczawnica-Palenica is available at 6 km distance.

See also
Pieniński Park Narodowy
Dunajec River
Dunajec River Gorge
Nowy Targ
Zakopane
Krościenko
Trzy Korony massif

External links
History of Krościenko 
official site of Gmina Krościenko nad Dunajcem 
 Jewish Community in Krościenko nad Dunajcem on Virtual Shtetl

Villages in Nowy Targ County
Kraków Voivodeship (14th century – 1795)
Kingdom of Galicia and Lodomeria
Kraków Voivodeship (1919–1939)